Tututepec Mixtec is a Mixtec language of Oaxaca, spoken in Santa María Acatepec, Santa Cruz Tututepec, San Pedro Tututepec and other towns. It is not close to other varieties of Mixtec.

Ethnologue estimates 61% intelligibility of Ixtayutla Mixtec, and 50% of Pinotepa Mixtec.

References

External links 
OLAC resources in and about the Tututepec Mixtec language

Mixtec language
Endangered Oto-Manguean languages